The Whitelaw Cup is an annual award given to the winner of the ECAC Men's Ice Hockey Tournament. The recipient receives ECAC Hockey's automatic bid to that year's NCAA Tournament.

History
The tournament has had slight variations over the course of its history, but until 2003 it entailed 8 or 10 teams in three rounds of play. Since 2003, it has contained 12 teams in four rounds of play.

The tournament was first hosted at the Boston Arena in Boston with St. Lawrence winning the inaugural tournament. The Boston Garden in Boston hosted the tournament every year from 1967 through 1992 and was succeeded by the Herb Brooks Arena in Lake Placid, New York from 1993 to 2002 and again from 2014 to the present. The Times Union Center and the Boardwalk Hall have also hosted ECAC tournament championships.
Cornell has won the most ECAC Hockey championships with 12. Cornell and Harvard are tied for the most championship game appearances with 23. Mike Schafer and Joe Marsh have both coached five championship teams, with the former appearing in the most title games (11).

In 1989 the trophy was renamed in honor of retiring commissioner Robert Whitelaw.

The ECAC tournament is the oldest active collegiate ice hockey conference tournament.

Champions

Championships by School

References

External links
The Official Site of ECAC Hockey

 
College ice hockey in the United States lists